Frank Stringfellow (March 1888 – 1948) was an English professional footballer who played as an inside forward in the Football League for Bournemouth & Boscombe Athletic, Portsmouth and The Wednesday.

Personal life 
Stringfellow served as a private in the Machine Gun Corps of the British Army during the First World War. He was wounded in September 1918, just under two months before the Armistice.

Career statistics

Honours 
Portsmouth

Southern League First Division: 1919–20

References

Military personnel from Nottinghamshire
Sportspeople from Sutton-in-Ashfield
Footballers from Nottinghamshire
English footballers
Association football inside forwards
English Football League players
British Army personnel of World War I
Machine Gun Corps soldiers
Ilkeston United F.C. players
Sheffield Wednesday F.C. players
Portsmouth F.C. players
Heart of Midlothian F.C. players
Weymouth F.C. players
Pontypridd F.C. players
AFC Bournemouth players
Scunthorpe United F.C. players
Midland Football League players
Southern Football League players
Scottish Football League players
1948 deaths
1888 births
Broxburn United F.C. players
Mansfield Town F.C. players
Date of birth unknown
Date of death unknown
Place of death unknown